Historical science may refer to:
 History, the study of the past as it is described in written documents
 Auxiliary sciences of history
 Any science that draws its data from records of past events, as opposed to "experimental" or "operational" science

See also
 History of science